The Netherlands Football League Championship 1931–1932 was contested by 50 teams participating in five divisions. The national champion would be determined by a play-off featuring the winners of the eastern, northern, southern and two western football divisions of the Netherlands. AFC Ajax won this year's championship by beating Feijenoord, SC Enschede, PSV Eindhoven and Veendam.

New entrants
Eerste Klasse North:
Promoted from 2nd Division: FVC
Eerste Klasse South:
Promoted from 2nd Division: Bleijerheide
Eerste Klasse West-I:
Moving in from West-II: HVV Den Haag, KFC, RCH and Sparta Rotterdam
Promoted from 2nd Division: West Frisia
Eerste Klasse West-II:
Moving in from West-I: DFC, Koninklijke HFC, VUC and ZFC
Promoted from 2nd Division: Xerxes

Divisions

Eerste Klasse East

Eerste Klasse North

Eerste Klasse South

Eerste Klasse West-I

Eerste Klasse West-II

Championship play-off

References
RSSSF Netherlands Football League Championships 1898-1954
RSSSF Eerste Klasse Oost
RSSSF Eerste Klasse Noord
RSSSF Eerste Klasse Zuid
RSSSF Eerste Klasse West

Neth
Netherlands Football League Championship seasons
Neth